Arne Solli (6 April 1938 – 20 September 2017) was a Norwegian Army general who served as Chief of Defence of Norway (Forsvarssjef) from 31 October 1994 until 30 April 1999.

In 1995 he was awarded the title of Commander of the Royal Norwegian Order of St. Olav.

References

1938 births
2017 deaths
People from Molde
Norwegian Army generals
Chiefs of Defence (Norway)